Ruby's Choice is a 2021 Australian drama directed by Michael Budd and produced by Michael Budd and Jessica Butland, and Holly Brisley. It stars Jane Seymour, Jacqueline McKenzie, Stephen Hunter and Coco Jack Gillies. Written by Paul Mahoney, the film was financed by philanthropist Sir Owen Glenn of the Glenn Family Foundation.

It follows Ruby (played by Seymour) as a woman with early dementia and its impact on her and her family when she is no longer able to live independently. It showcases that people living with dementia can still offer a  meaningful contribution to those around them and that there is still a person there with memories, emotions and value.

The film had its world premiere on February 22, 2022, at the Hayden Orpheum Picture Palace and is set to be theatrically released across Australia and New Zealand on March 3, 2022.

On the 7th March 2022, Ruby's Choice premiered in Santa Barbara, California at the 37th Santa Barbara International Film Festival where it was Nominee Best International Feature Film.

Plot 
Ruby, a sweet creative elderly lady who lives alone, has undiagnosed dementia. After she accidentally burns her house down, she is forced to shift into her daughter Sharon's crowded home and share her granddaughter Tash's bedroom. Tash goes from hating Ruby to loving her as she learns more about some family secrets, and she becomes Ruby's fiercest advocate when Sharon thinks it's time for a Nursing Home. Unable to access services required to keep Ruby safe, Sharon is faced with the ultimate dilemma to go against Ruby’s wishes or do what she thinks is best for her mother.

Cast 

 Jane Seymour as Ruby
 Jacqueline McKenzie as Sharon
 Coco Jack Gillies as Tash
 Stephen Hunter as Doug
 Nicole Pastor as Adult Tash
 Brendan Donoghue as Ken
 Rory Potter as Ned
 Sam Rechner as Jack
 Michael Budd as Zane

The production was halted due to COVID-19 and moved from Queensland to Windsor to complete filming under strict COVID guidelines in August 2020. Budd described shooting a feature film in the middle of a pandemic as the most challenging of any of his past feature films.

Release 
Ruby's Choice was screened at the Margaret River HEART for CinefestOZ on Sunday 29 August 2021, before its world premiere on February 22, 2022, at the Hayden Orpheum Picture Palace. Ruby's Choice was theatrically released across Australia and New Zealand on March 3, 2022.

Reception 
Marina Marangos of Weekend Notes wrote that the film "handles the difficult subject of dementia with honesty" and provides "a new and heartwarming message about how sometimes we should look beyond the difficulties and see the messages of hope and love through the eyes and lives of people living with dementia".

Awards Nominations 
Santa Barbara, California at the 37th Santa Barbara International Film Festival where it was Nominee "Best International Feature Film"

Nominee Film Critics Circle of Australia FCCA Award	Best Actor - Supporting Role Stephen Hunter

WINNER Australian Screen Industry Network Feature Film Ruby's Choice

WINNER Australian Screen Industry Network best actress Jane Seymour Ruby's Choice

Nominee Australian Screen Industry Network Best Director Michael Budd Ruby's Choice

References

External links 
 

2021 drama films